The Women's 60 metres hurdles event  at the 2007 European Athletics Indoor Championships was held on March 2.

Medalists

Results

Heats
First 2 of each heat (Q) and the next 2 fastest (q) qualified for the final.

Final

References
Results

60
60 metres hurdles at the European Athletics Indoor Championships
2007 in women's athletics